Robert Kuntz may refer to:

Robert J. Kuntz (born 1955), game designer
Bobby Kuntz (1932–2011), Canadian football linebacker